The Qatari riyal (sign: QR in Latin,  in Arabic; ISO code: QAR) is the currency of the State of Qatar. It is divided into 100 dirhams.

History 
Until 1966, Qatar used the Indian rupee as its currency, in the form of Gulf rupees. When India devalued the rupee in 1966, Qatar, along with the other states using the Gulf rupee, chose to introduce its own currency.

Before doing so, Qatar briefly adopted the Saudi riyal, then introduced the Qatar and Dubai riyal following the signing of the Qatar-Dubai Currency Agreement on 21 March 1966. The Saudi riyal was worth 1.065 Gulf rupees, whilst the Qatar and Dubai riyal was equal to the Gulf rupee prior to its devaluation.

Following Dubai's entry into the United Arab Emirates, Qatar began issuing the Qatari riyal separate from Dubai on 19 May 1973. The old notes continued to circulate in parallel for 90 days, at which time they were withdrawn.

For a wider history surrounding currency in the region, see the history of British currency in the Middle East.

Coins 

In 1966, coins were introduced in the name of Qatar and Dubai for 1, 5, 10, 25, and 50 dirhams. In 1973, a new series of coins was introduced in the same sizes and compositions as the earlier pieces but in the name of Qatar only. Only 25 and 50 dirham coins are now circulated

Banknotes 
On September 18, 1966, the Qatar & Dubai Currency Board introduced notes for 1, 5, 10, 25, 50, and 100 riyals. These were replaced on 19 May 1973 by notes of the Qatar Monetary Agency in denominations of 1, 5, 10, 100, and 500 riyals; a 50 riyal note was issued in 1976. The Qatar Central Bank was established by decree 15 on 5 August 1973. All coins and notes issued by the Qatar Monetary Agency became the property of the bank but continued to circulate for several years. On December 13, 2020, the Qatar Central Bank issued its fifth series of banknotes for circulation. Included in this series is the 200 riyal banknote. The front side of the notes share a common design based on traditional geometric patterns, the Flag of Qatar, Qatari flora and a gate representing historic Qatari architecture.

Qatar issued a commemorative 22 riyal note for the 2022 FIFA World Cup.

Fixed exchange rate 
The Qatari riyal is pegged to the US dollar at a fixed exchange rate of US$1 = QR 3.64. This rate was enshrined into Qatari law by Royal Decree No.34 of 2001, signed by Hamad bin Khalifa Al Thani, Emir of Qatar, on 9 July 2001.

Article (1) states that the Qatari riyal exchange rate shall be pegged against the US dollar at QR 3.64, and sets upper and lower limits of QR 3.6415 and QR 3.6385 for the Qatar Central Bank's purchase and sale of dollars with banks operating in Qatar. Article (2) provides the Qatar Central Bank with the authority to determine the volume and the time of sale of US dollars and the associated conditions of such sales and payments. Article (3) cancels the earlier Royal Decree No.60 of 1975, by which the riyal was officially pegged to the IMF's special drawing rights (SDRs).

Effect of the 2017 Qatar diplomatic crisis 

In response to the 2017 Qatar diplomatic crisis, banks in the countries blockading Qatar had to stop trading with Qatari banks. This led to a fall in liquidity offshore and a move away from the fixed exchange rate outside of Qatar, with up to QR 3.81 being required to buy 1 US dollar in late June 2017, a situation that continued until December 2017.

This also led to cessation of trading of Qatari banknotes outside of Qatar with certain banks in certain countries such as the UK.

Within Qatar itself, however, the Central Bank of Qatar has continued to buy and sell US dollars at the fixed rate.

See also 
 Cooperation Council for the Arab States of the Gulf
 Economy of Qatar
 Qatar Central Bank

References

External links 
 The banknotes of Qatar 

Fixed exchange rate
Currencies introduced in 1973
Riyal